Chelsea Jade Metcalf (born 11 May 1989) is a South African-born New Zealand singer-songwriter and record producer based in Los Angeles. Vice has described her as New Zealand's "Accidental Dream Pop Hero". In 2017, she was nominated for New Zealand’s Silver Scroll Award for song of the year for her song "Life of the Party." As a songwriter, Jade has written with numerous artists including The Chainsmokers, Wet, and Attlas.

Career 
Chelsea Jade was born in Cape Town, South Africa. Her family relocated to Auckland, New Zealand when she was five years old. In high school, she formed the folk trio Teacups with schoolmates Elizabeth Stokes (The Beths) and Talita Setyady. The band opened shows for Cat Power, Kimya Dawson, and José González.

Jade’s first solo project, Watercolours, won her the New Zealand Music Award’s Critic Choice prize in 2012. In 2014, she released her second EP, Beacons, her first release as Chelsea Jade. That year she participated in the Red Bull Music Academy in Tokyo, Japan.

In 2015 she relocated to Los Angeles to pursue her own artist career as well as writing songs for others.

Jade was a recipient of a 2017 APRA professional development award, presented every two years to three New Zealand songwriters and composers who demonstrate outstanding potential in their field.

Her first full-length album Personal Best was released on 20 July 2018. It includes collaborations with New Zealand producers Leroy Clampitt (Big Taste), Sam McCarthy (BoyBoy), Justin Pilbrow, and American producer Brad Hale (of Now, Now).

She has opened for Lorde, who is a friend of hers. In August 2021, Jade appeared in Lorde's "Mood Ring" music video.  

On 15 April 2020, she released the single "Superfan" and its accompanying music video.

Discography

Studio albums

Extended plays

Singles

As featured artist

Guest appearances

Songwriting credits

References

21st-century New Zealand  women singers
1989 births
Living people
South African emigrants to New Zealand